William Thomas Pipes (April 15, 1850 – October 7, 1909) was a politician in Nova Scotia, Canada.

Biography 

Pipes was born in Amherst, Nova Scotia. He ran in the 1878 federal election against Charles Tupper, but was unable to wrest away Tupper's seat in the House of Commons of Canada. In 1882, Pipes ran as a Liberal candidate in the provincial election and won a seat.

The Liberals unexpectedly won the most seats in the legislature despite the fact that they had no leader. William S. Fielding was at the time editor of the Halifax Morning Chronicle and could have become premier, but declined due to his lack of financial resources.

The caucus selected Pipes to lead the party and become the sixth Premier. The position was an unpaid one at the time, so Pipes had to continue his law practice. Pipes served as premier for two years, but was hobbled by personal problems and the need to earn a living. He induced Fielding to enter cabinet, and they became close collaborators.

The principal policy objective of the Pipes government was to secure a transfer of the Pictou railway line from the federal government to the province and to purchase and complete the privately owned "Eastern Extension Railway". The federal and provincial governments were unable to agree on a price, and the Pipes government abandoned the project. The Pipes government also tried to get financial assistance from Ottawa, but was unsuccessful, and was forced to cut government spending.

Pipes' personal situation became increasingly untenable, and his relations with his cabinet (aside from Fielding) were frayed. On July 15, 1884, Pipes resigned as Premier, and nominated Fielding as his successor.

Pipes broke with Fielding in 1886, however, as Fielding moved for the province's secession from Canadian confederation due to the federal government's neglect of the province's demands. During that year's election, Pipes referred to Fielding's campaign as "the putrid carcass of repeal".

In 1887, Pipes again attempted to win a seat in the federal House of Commons, but again failed to dislodge Tupper. In 1906, he returned to provincial politics, and served as Attorney-General in the cabinet of  Premier George Henry Murray until his death in Boston.

Pipes was involved in business as director of Amherst Boot and Shoe Manufacturing Co, a large shareholder in the Rhodes Curry Company, and director and secretary of the Nova Scotia Lumber Company. He held these positions during his time as a provincial cabinet minister.

References

 

1882 in Canada
Canadian Methodists
Canadian people of English descent
Nova Scotia Liberal Party MLAs
People from Amherst, Nova Scotia
Premiers of Nova Scotia
1850 births
1909 deaths
Nova Scotia political party leaders